Penley is a surname. Notable people with the surname include:

 Aaron Edwin Penley (1806–1870), British painter
 Howard E. Penley, American socialist organizer and official
 W. S. Penley (1851–1912), British actor, singer, and comedian

See also
 Penney